This enclave of scientific research is officially known as Astro Space Center of PN Lebedev Physics Institute, (ASC LPI) and is under the purview of the  Russian Academy of Sciences. Generally speaking, the space center's   mission  focuses on astrophysics, which includes cosmology. The emphasis is on accomplishing basic research  in this science. The research  leads into exploring the composition, and structure of  astronomical objects, interstellar and interplanetary space along with exploring how these evolved.

ASC divisions
The Astro Space Center is separated into three divisions, two of which are national observatories.  These three divisions are the " Moscow branch", the Pushchino Radio Astronomy Observatory, and Kalyazin Radio Astronomy Observatory. The ASC divisions accomplish research, and achieve scientific milestones, and perform administrative duties as well.

Moscow branch
The Moscow branch is itself divided into approximately eight divisions. These branches conduct research in Theoretical physics, the thermal history of the universe, various properties of extragalactic objects, and design and development of space and astronomy research equipment The research of the Moscow Branch enters other related areas of research.

Pushchino Radio Astronomy Observatory

It has an array of antennas running N-S and E-W, and produced a fan beam in the sky. It is sited near Pushchino.

It employs 45 researchers along with 60 engineers and technicians to accomplish staff the several major departments and several labs of the observatory. These are combined with 80 other people who perform administrative duties, workshops, garage, and a staff of guards. 
The departments and labs are designed to focus on scientific and technical aspects of observatory sciences.

The departments are as follows: Plasma astrophysics, Extragalactic radio astronomy, Pulsar physics, Space radio spectroscopy,  and  Pulsar astrometry. The laboratories are as follows: Radio astronomy equipment, Automation radio astronomy research, Computer engineering and information technology, and Radio telescopes of the meter wavelength range.

Kalyazin Radio Astronomy Observatory
It has a dish antenna to the east of Kalyazin.

Achievements of the ASC
The ASC has led the development and deployment of an international VLBI project. It is called the RadioAstron. VLBI stands for (Very Long Baseline Interferometry), for radio astronomy. It allows observations of an object that are made simultaneously by many telescopes to be combined, emulating a telescope with a size equal to the maximum separation between the telescopes.

Achievements in theoretical physics, evolution of the extragalactic objects, etc.

Notable works
The following are notable works published in affiliation with Russia's Astro Space Center:
  Affiliations: Astro Space Center of Moscow, and Theoretical Astrophysics Center of Copenhagen.

Notes

References

Astrophysics institutes
Astronomical observatories in Russia
Radio astronomy
Institutes of the Russian Academy of Sciences
Astronomy in the Soviet Union